U-12 may refer to one of the following German submarines:
 , was a Type U 9 submarine launched in 1910 and that served in the First World War until sunk on 10 March 1915
 During the First World War, Germany also had these submarines with similar names:
 , a Type UB I submarine launched in 1915 and disappeared in August 1918
 , a Type UC I submarine launched in 1915 and sunk on 16 March 1916; raised by Italy and became Italian submarine X-1;
 , a Type IIB submarine that served in the Second World War and was sunk on 8 October 1939
 , a Type 205 submarine of the Bundesmarine that was launched in 1969 and decommissioned in 2005

Submarines of Germany